This is a list of the municipalities in the province of Ciudad Real in the autonomous community of Castile–La Mancha, Spain.

See also
Geography of Spain
List of municipalities of Spain

Municipalities in the Province of Ciudad Real
Ciudad Real